Alex is a commune in the Haute-Savoie department in the Auvergne-Rhône-Alpes region in south-eastern France.

Geography
The Fier forms most of the commune's northern border.

Population

See also
 Communes of the Haute-Savoie department
 Allex, Drôme

References

External links

 Alex official website

Communes of Haute-Savoie